Clinidium dux is a species of ground beetle in the subfamily Rhysodinae. It was described by Ross Bell & J.R. Bell in 2009. It is only known from the holotype, a female, collected from the island of Marinduque, the Philippines. The taxonomic affinities of this species remain uncertain as male specimens are unknown. The specific name refers to the type locality, duque (="duke") being derived from the Latin dux, meaning "leader".

Clinidium dux holotype measures  in length.

References

Clinidium
Beetles of Asia
Insects of the Philippines
Endemic fauna of the Philippines
Beetles described in 2009